Lawrence William Hunt (born 19 March 1966) is a British entrepreneur, founder and chief executive officer of Silverjet Aviation Limited, a business-class airline. Silverjet suspended operations on 30 May 2008.

Involved with start-up businesses since 1984, Hunt has held a number of posts at various companies. At Novell, a US technology business which listed on NASDAQ in 1987, he was the distribution and product manager; at BMS, a technology consulting partnership, sold to Cap Gemini in 1992, Hunt held the position of head of sales and marketing; he was sales and marketing director of Database Management Sciences Limited, sold to IBM in 1993; he founded Rapid Travel Solutions Limited, sold to Telewest Communications Plc in 2003; and at lowcosttravelgroup.com Limited (www.lowcostholidays.com), founded in 2004 by Paul Evans and Hunt, where he was a non-executive director until the company went into administration on 15 July 2016. Lawrence was non-executive chairman of Deallus Holdings, a global business intelligence company founded in 2006 to provide competitive research and analysis to the life sciences and pharmaceutical industries. Deallus was sold to Archimed S.A., a French private equity business in November 2015. Hunt is currently owner and chairman of www.addmustard.com a performance marketing, technology and creative agency; He is also an investor and non-executive director of CDDPro, a tech business which is launching an intelligent customer on-boarding solution for the finance industry; Hunt is also involved in the development of www.orbzii.com, an app which brings together dreaming, planning and booking travel into a single app.

Hunt felt that the traditional model of business passengers paying higher rates in order to subside the cheaper economy seats was nonsensical, and that a business-class only service, based on the single carriage model of low-cost carriers, was a viable business idea. Silverjet featured a separate ladies bathroom, a private terminal and carbon neutral status. Silverjet won 14 awards in its first year of operation and carried over 100,000 passengers. It achieved passenger load factors of 80% on its first aircraft and 70% across its fleet of three, but the financial crises of 2008, poor investor sentiment to the sector and the failure of investors to meet commitments ultimately led to the failure of the company. Trading of Silverjet's shares on the AIM was suspended on 23 May 2008, and the company suspended operations on 30 May 2008.

In July 2008, Hunt returned to lowcosttravelgroup and launched lowcostholidays.com in January 2009. lowcostholidays.com was the fourth largest online travel agent in the UK and was rolled out to Ireland, Sweden, Norway, Germany, Spain and Italy in 2011 and 2012 and the United States and Australia in 2013. Lowcosttravelgroup acquired Resorthoppa in 2009 and subsequently merged it with A2Btransfers.co.uk in 2012. It also acquired Intuitive Ltd., a travel software business in 2010, and sold it to NVM ventures in 2012.

Lowcost Travel ceased trading on 15 July 2016.

Hunt was a shareholder and informal advisor to Loveholidays between 2012 and 2016. Loveholidays is now the second largest OTA in the UK and was sold to Living Bridge a mid market private equity firm for a reported £180m+, 27 X trailing EBITDA.

In April 2014, Hunt was also appointed as chairman of global life sciences research and strategy company Deallus Holdings. Deallus was sold to Archimed S.A., a French private equity firm.

In 2016, Hunt acquired addmustard, a brand, marketing & technology agency focused on working with entrepreneurs to grow their business and is currently chairman.

In 2019, Hunt invested in CDDPro, a start up software company developing AI technology for retail, commercial and investment banks. Lawrence is a founder Director working on the technology and marketing strategies for the business.

Since 2019, Hunt has been working with a group of global private investors to plan, fund and create Orbzii, a travel app which uses AI to allow users to browse Instagram-style travel content, learn about customer travel preferences, search prices and availability, create itineraries and book in a single app. The app launched at the end of 2020 for both Android and Apple users.

References

1966 births
English chief executives
Living people